William Stack  was an Irish Anglican priest in the  15th century: he was  Archdeacon of Aghadoe during 1408.

References

{

16th-century Irish Anglican priests
Archdeacons of Ardfert